Antaios was a German cultural magazine published from 1959 to 1971 by  and edited by Mircea Eliade and Ernst Jünger. It had a conservative orientation and promoted perennial philosophy and the study of archetypes. The magazine drew inspiration from the Eranos circle and the German cultural magazine Merkur. It had a circulation of around 3000 copies in its early existence and around 1200 by the time it was discontinued.

History

The bi-monthly magazine Antaios was initiated by the publisher , who wanted to involve the scholars of the Eranos circle, which held regular conferences mainly focused on religious studies, in a conservative cultural magazine. Role models for Antaios were the Eranos yearbooks, the cultural magazine Merkur and Mircea Eliade's journal . Eliade, an Eranos regular, was recruited by Klett as an editor. Ernst Jünger had been impressed by Zalmoxis and accepted to edit the magazine with Eliade; other people who had been approached but rejected the position included Aldous Huxley, Joseph Campbell and Karl Jaspers. Klett's nephew Philipp Wolff-Windegg was appointed as editor-in-chief. Although Eliade's and Jünger's names were closely associated with the magazine, their involvement as editors was very limited, and it was Wolff-Windegg who handled the selection of writers and articles.

The first six issues were published with the subtitle Zeitschrift für eine freie Welt. In the early existence of the magazine, the circulation was around 3000; toward the end it was around 1200. Due to the failure to increase the readership and Klett's acquisition of Merkur in 1968, Antaios was discontinued in 1971.

Contents
Each issue is around 100 pages long and mainly consists of essays and articles on cultural history. There is no narrative prose but literary sketches sometimes appear. Characteristic is the priority of perennial philosophy and archetypes over historical-sociological perspectives. Many of the texts discuss the West's place in the world, which typically is portrayed as increasingly weak. Some of the content can be classified as esotericism.

Through Eliade, the outlook of the archaic man is a recurring theme, and Jünger and his brother Friedrich Georg Jünger made a focus point of technology and its issues. It was a stated goal to serve "tradition", which was said to exist in "myth, symbol and poetry [Dichtung]", although the term itself was not further specified; it is unclear if it was related to the initiatory "Tradition" of Julius Evola, who was published in the magazine twice. Other contributors included Will Erich Peuckert, Marcel Jouhandeau and Ernesto de Martino. According to the scholar Ulrich van Loyen, the absence of Jewish contributors can be attributed to Klett.

See also
 Antaeus
 Conservative Revolution
 Counterculture of the 1960s
 Planète
 Traditionalist School

References

Citations

Sources

 
 
 

1959 establishments in West Germany
1971 disestablishments in West Germany
Cultural magazines published in Germany
Conservative magazines published in Germany
Bi-monthly magazines published in Germany
German-language magazines
Magazines established in 1959
Magazines disestablished in 1971
Mircea Eliade
Ernst Jünger
Perennial philosophy
Western esoteric magazines
Mythology magazines
Defunct political magazines published in Germany
Magazines published in Stuttgart